Hrvoje Horvat (born 22 May 1946) is a Croatian handball coach and player who competed in the 1972 Summer Olympics and in the 1976 Summer Olympics for SFR Yugoslavia.

International career
He was part of the Yugoslav team which won the gold medal at the Munich Games. He played all six matches and scored fifteen goals. Four years later he was a member of the Yugoslav team which finished fifth. He played all six matches and scored fifteen goals again.

Managerial career
In 2005 he became coach of German team HSC 2000 Coburg and has led them up into the second league.

Personal life
His nickname is Cveba, which is the Croatian word for raisin. Horvat has a son Hrvoje, who is also a handball coach, and daughters Jasenka, who was married to the late Iztok Puc, one of the best players in handball history, and Vanja, who was married to former footballer and now a manager Zoran Mamić.

Honours
Player
Partizan Bjelovar
Yugoslav First League (7): 1966–67, 1967–68, 1969–70, 1970–71, 1971–72, 1976–77, 1978–79
European Cup 
Winner (1): 1971–72
Finalist (1): 1972–73

Coach
HSC 2000 Coburg
Regionaliga Süd (1): 2006–07

References

External links
profile
 - profile and picture on HSC 2000 Coburg website 

1946 births
Living people
Croatian male handball players
Sportspeople from Bjelovar
Olympic handball players of Yugoslavia
Yugoslav male handball players
Handball players at the 1972 Summer Olympics
Handball players at the 1976 Summer Olympics
Olympic gold medalists for Yugoslavia
Olympic medalists in handball
Medalists at the 1972 Summer Olympics
Mediterranean Games gold medalists for Yugoslavia
Competitors at the 1967 Mediterranean Games
Croatian handball coaches
Mediterranean Games medalists in handball